Old Oak Common Lane railway station is a proposed railway station in West London, UK. Old Oak Common Lane station would be situated about 400 yards (350 metres) to the west of the planned Old Oak Common railway station and will offer interchange between London Overground and other rail services, including National Rail (Great Western Railway), Crossrail (the Elizabeth Line) and High Speed 2. It is one of two proposed new stations which will connect with Old Oak Common, the other being  on the West London line.

Proposals

It is also planned to construct a footbridge to give access to the station from Victoria Road (A4000 road) via Midland Terrace. Interchange with the Crossrail station will be determined by the design of the new Old Oak Common station.

Under the Transport and Works Act 1992, the project will be subject to a Transport and Works Act Order (TWAO) and governmental funding if construction is to proceed. The scheme would also be examined at a public inquiry before it could be approved by the Secretary of State for Transport.

In October 2017, Transport for London began a public consultation on the construction of two new Overground stations, Hythe Road on the West London line and Old Oak Common Lane on the North London line. In December 2018, TfL stated that the construction of the two stations would be heavily dependent on securing government funding.

Old Oak Common Lane would be served by London Overground trains running on the North London Line. This scheme, known as the West London Orbital, is currently at public consultation stage with TfL.

References

Proposed London Overground stations